Thotapalli Gudur is a village in Nellore district in the state of Andhra Pradesh in India.

Geography
It has an average elevation of 4 meters (16 feet).

References 

Villages in Nellore district